Tang Miao may refer to:
Tang Miao (footballer, born October 1990), Chinese soccer footballer from Liaoning, who plays for Guangzhou R&F F.C and China national team
Tang Miao (footballer, born November 1990), Chinese soccer footballer from Anhui, who plays for Jiangsu Sainty F.C.

See also
Tang Miao or Tangmiao ( Tangmiao Town), in Yuncheng County, Heze Prefecture, Shandong Province, China, see List of township-level divisions of Shandong